Novoadzitarovo (Yañı Atyetär) is a rural locality (a village) in Batyrovsky Selsoviet, Aurgazinsky District, Bashkortostan, Russia. The population was 372 as of 2010. There are 7 streets.

Geography 
Novoadzitarovo is located 12 km east of Tolbazy (the district's administrative centre) by road. Kuyezbashevo is the nearest rural locality.

References 

Rural localities in Aurgazinsky District